Thirteen ships of the French Navy have borne the name Robuste ("Robust"):

Ships named Robuste 
 Robuste (1758), a 74-gun ship of the line, condemned in 1783 and taken to pieces in 1784. 
 Robuste (1784), a pontoon in Lorient harbour.
 Robuste (1793), a 20-gun corvette 
 Robuste (1794), a merchantman requisitioned as a transport
 Robuste (1806), a 80-gun ship of the line 
 Robuste (1811), a stone-carrying barge 
 Robuste (1828), a transport
 Robuste (1861), a steam paddle tug.
 Robuste (1865), a sail transport.

 Robuste (1913), a tug
 Robuste II (1915), an armed sloop.
 Robuste (1944), a tug, formerly USS YTL-157, which served most of her career in Toulon as Mésange 
 Robuste (1960), a coastal tug

See also

Notes and references

Notes

References

Bibliography 
 
 

French Navy ship names